Clydebank and Milngavie (Gaelic: Bruach Chluaidh agus Muileann-Ghaidh) is a constituency of the Scottish Parliament covering part of the council areas of East Dunbartonshire and West Dunbartonshire. It elects one Member of the Scottish Parliament (MSP) by the first past the post method of election. It is also one of ten constituencies in the West Scotland electoral region, which elects seven additional members, in addition to the ten constituency MSPs, to produce a form of proportional representation for the region as a whole.

The current member is Marie McNair of the Scottish National Party (SNP), who has held the seat since the 2021 Scottish Parliament election.

Electoral region 

The other nine constituencies of the West Scotland region are Cunninghame North, Cunninghame South, Dumbarton, Eastwood, Greenock and Inverclyde, Paisley, Renfrewshire North and West, the Renfrewshire South and Strathkelvin and Bearsden.

The region covers part of the Argyll and Bute council area, the East Dunbartonshire council area, the East Renfrewshire council area, the Inverclyde council area, North Ayrshire council area, the Renfrewshire council area and the West Dunbartonshire council area.

Constituency boundaries and council area 

The rest of East Dunbartonshire is covered by the Strathkelvin and Bearsden constituency; the rest of West Dunbartonshire is covered by the Dumbarton constituency.

The Clydebank and Milngavie constituency was created at the same time as the Scottish Parliament, in 1999, with the name and boundaries of an  existing Westminster constituency. In 2005, however, the Westminster (House of Commons) constituency was abolished in favour of new constituencies.  Clydebank and Milngavie was retained as a Scottish Parliament constituency.

The constituency boundaries were reviewed ahead of the 2011 Scottish Parliament election. The electoral wards used to form Clydebank and Milngavie are listed below.

Milngavie (East Dunbartonshire)
Bearsden North (East Dunbartonshire)
Kilpatrick (West Dunbartonshire)
Clydebank Central (West Dunbartonshire)
Clydebank Waterfront (West Dunbartonshire)

Member of the Scottish Parliament

Election results

2020s

2010s

2000s

1990s

Notes

References

External links

Constituencies of the Scottish Parliament
1999 establishments in Scotland
Constituencies established in 1999
Clydebank
Scottish Parliament constituencies and regions 1999–2011
Scottish Parliament constituencies and regions from 2011
Politics of East Dunbartonshire
Politics of West Dunbartonshire
Milngavie
Bearsden